Take 1 is a South Korean music docuseries reality show produced by Netflix starring Sumi Jo, Lena Park, Mamamoo, Jung Ji-hoon (Rain), AKMU, You Hee-yeol and Yim Jae-beom.

Synopsis
Take 1 is a heartfelt show which revolves around the step-by-step process of artists creating the most meaningful performance of their careers, that started from the question "If you could perform just one stage before you die?".

Format
In each episode, the show will feature a different artist from South Korea, with the goal of performing one song. Each act is given a countdown timer for when they are due to perform. In the time allocated, each act can choose where they would like to perform, and who they would like to perform with them such as dancers and other artists in one take.

Episodes

Development

Production
On July 12, 2022, Yoo Ki-hwan, manager of the Netflix Korean content team, introduced Take 1 as the first Netflix Korea's music entertainment show with ensemble casting of singers Sumi Jo, Yim Jae-beom, Lena Park, Jung Ji-hoon (Rain), girl group Mamamoo, and brother and sister duo AKMU.

The show is created by Kim Hak-min of Studio Slam who were behind the production of Sing Again and Two Yoo Project – Sugar Man 3, and written by Yoo Jin-young, who previously wrote Amazing Saturday.

Filming
The singers were given the opportunity to choose time, place and audience, to sing the "best song of their life".

Release
The show is expected to air in the fall of 2022. On September 15, 2022, the first teaser for the show was released along with the announcement that it will premiere on October 14.

References

External links
 
 

2022 South Korean television series debuts
2022 South Korean television series endings
2020s documentary television series
Documentary television series about music
Korean-language Netflix original programming
Netflix original documentary television series
South Korean music television shows
South Korean variety television shows